Marley is a census-designated place (CDP) in Will County, Illinois, United States. It is in the northern part of the county, between Homer Glen to the north and Mokena to the south. Marley is bordered to the south by Interstate 80, but with no direct access. U.S. Route 6 (Southwest Highway) passes just north of Marley, leading west-southwest  to Joliet and northeast  to Orland Park.

Marley was first listed as a CDP prior to the 2020 census.

Demographics

References 

Census-designated places in Will County, Illinois
Census-designated places in Illinois